Malshanger FC were a successful village team from Malshanger near Basingstoke.

History
Malshanger FC originally began their existence as a Sunday side in the Basingstoke League. After winning almost everything the club switched their attentions to Saturday football in the early 1970s where they soon climbed up through the Basingstoke and North Hants Leagues.

In 1979 Malshanger successfully applied to join the Hampshire League Division 4 where they won promotion at the first attempt. The club consolidated before winning promotion to Division 2 in 1985. The following year the league was re-structured after an exodus of top clubs left to join the newly formed Wessex League. As a result, Malshanger were placed in Division 1 but found the step up too much and were relegated after just one season. The 1990–91 campaign was a memorable one for Malshanger as they bounced back in style by winning the Division 2 and Hampshire Intermediate Cup double. The club remained in the top flight (twice winning the North Hants Senior Cup) until relegation in 1997, which resulted in a player exodus and the club folding just as the following season commenced.

Malshanger's old ground at the village Recreation Ground remains in use for local league football and is also used by the village cricket club.

Honours
Hampshire League Division 2
Champions 1990–91
Hampshire FA Intermediate Cup
Winners 1990–91
North Hants Senior Cup
Winners 1993–94 and 1995–96
North Hants League
Champions 1978–79
Basingstoke & District League
Champions 1977–78

Records

League

External links
http://www.fchd.info/MALSHANG.HTM

Defunct football clubs in England
Association football clubs disestablished in 1997
1997 disestablishments in England
Basingstoke and District Football League
North Hants League
Hampshire League
Defunct football clubs in Hampshire
Association football clubs established in the 20th century